Tian Di, also known in United Kingdom as Chinese Untouchables, is a 1994 Hong Kong action crime drama film directed by David Lai. Set in the 1920s, the film stars Andy Lau as a Cantonese-born, Nanjing government investigator who has been appointed by the first Commissioner of the opium trade ban. The film was produced by Lau's film company Teamwork Motion Pictures.

Plot
Cheung Yat-pang (Andy Lau), Cantonese native whom recently returned from France to Nanjing after further studies, has been appointed by the Chinese government to be the first Commissioner of the opium trade ban. He accompanies his wife, So-so, to Shanghai to outlaw illegal opium trade, but upon his arrival, a young boy tells him about the city's corrupt police force colluding with drug lords. Shanghai police commissioner Ngai Kwan organizes a welcome banquet for Cheung, where Ngai subtely threatens and bribes Cheung, who angrily walks out the party after seeing many officials smoking opium and declares he would mercilessly crack down any drug user or dealer.

Cheung receives intel about a drug trade taking place Zhabei brick mine and leads a raid there, only to realize it was a scheme planned by Ngai to trick him. Later, Cheung discovers one of his subordinates, Shantung Cat is addicted to opium and dismisses him, but Shantung Cat convinces Cheung he is his only loyal and only non-corrupt subordinate, and the two work together to confiscate and burn illegal opium, which angers drug lord Paul Tai, who retaliates by instructing Ngai to kill attack the pregnant So-so, causing a miscarriage. Furious, Cheung publicly punches Tai and declares hin a killer of his unborn child.

Since many opium shop owners had their goods confiscated by Cheung, Tai suggests them to sell packaged cocaine, which is overheard by Cheung's newly assigned assistant, Jean Wu, who is working undercover in Tai's cinema. Jean informs Cheung about Tai's drug base in Jiugong Mountains and Cheung raids the base with Jean and Shantung Cat, successfully killing Tai's henchmen and confiscating the drugs after engaging in a major gunfight. However, Cheung is later ambushed by Ngai's killers one night, where So-so is killed, while Jean was abducted by Tai and Ngai to interrogate her the whereabouts of the cocaine, driving her to suicide. Ngai abducts Cheung and injects him with drugs, forcibly taking a photo of Cheung smoking opium which makes it to the newspaper headline before detaining him in the police station. Shantung, armed with a machine gun, shoots up the police station and holds Ngai hostage while rescuing Cheung, but Shantung Cat is captured while Cheung flees and defeats a few of the crooked cops. Before being killed, Shantung Cat manages to manipulate Ngai into suspecting Tai.

Cheung puts the confiscated cocaine in Tai's cinema then lures Ngai there cinema during the premiere of a new film. There, Cheung shows edited footage of Tai taking a shipment of cocaine for himself, which angers Ngai, who finds the cocaine behind the cinema screen and attempts to shoot Tai, but he was killed by the latter. Tai also instructs his henchmen kill the cinema audience to rid any witnesses. Cheung, who is hiding behind the projection booth and recording the incident on film, is caught by one of Tai's henchmen who he fights and defeats before running with the footage he filmed and kills several more of Tai's henchmen. The henchman Cheung just fought gets up and attempts to strangle him, but Cheung throws the henchman off the balcony while he also jumps down and tackles Tai through a wall and a cinema screen. However, Tai survives and plays dead in front of Cheung. Afterwards, Cheung hands the footage he film to his superior General Lee and boards a train back to Guangzhou, where Lee bids farewell before shooting Cheung dead, stating he was born at the wrong time. In the end, it is reported to the public that Cheung committed suicide for fear of his crimes, while Tai is set free without any charges.

Cast
Andy Lau as Cheung Yat-pang (張一鵬), the main protagonist, a Nanjing government investigator from Canton who studied abroad in France and previously worked for the Republic of China Military Academy.
Damian Lau as Paul Tai (戴濟民), the main antagonist, a Shanghai drug lord who poses as a philanthropist on the surface.
Cherie Chan as So-so (素素), Cheung Yat-pang's wife.
Ku Pao-ming as Ngai Kwan (倪昆), the corrupt police commissioner of the Shanghai police force who colludes with Tai.
Chin Shih-chieh as Shantung Cat (山東貓), Cheung Yat-pang's assistant who is addicted to opium but is very loyal to Cheung.
Faye Yu as Jean Wu (鄔君), Cheung Yat-pang's assistant who was a formerly a doctor.
Hon San as Paul Tai's henchman.

Music

Theme song
The Love-Forgetting Potion (忘情水)
Composer: Chen Yao-chuan
Lyricist: Preston Lee
Singer: Andy Lau

Insert theme
Melodious (纏綿)
Composer: Hsiung Mei-ling
Lyricist: Eric Lin
Singer: Andy Lau

Box office
The film grossed HK$10,017,864 at the Hong Kong box office during its theatrical run from 21 July to 3 August 1994 in Hong Kong.

Accolades

References

External links

Tian Di at Hong Kong Cinemagic

1994 films
1994 action films
1990s crime action films
1990s crime drama films
Hong Kong action films
Hong Kong crime action films
Police detective films
Gun fu films
Cantonese-language films
Films produced by Andy Lau
Films about the illegal drug trade
Films about cocaine
Films set in the Republic of China (1912–1949)
Films set in Shanghai
Films set in Nanjing
Films set in the 1920s
Films directed by David Lai
1990s Hong Kong films